Mynes is a butterfly genus in the family Nymphalidae found in Australia and Indonesia.

Species
In alphabetical order:
 Mynes anemone Vane-Wright, 1976
 Mynes aroensis Ribbe, 1900
 Mynes doubledayi Wallace, 1869
 Mynes eucosmetus Godman & Salvin, 1879
 Mynes geoffroyi (Guérin-Méneville, 1831) – Jezebel nymph or white nymph
 Mynes halli Joicey & Talbot, 1922
 Mynes katharina Ribbe, 1898
 Mynes marpesina Röber, 1936
 Mynes plateni Staudinger, 1887
 Mynes talboti Juriaane & Volbreda, 1922
 Mynes websteri Grose-Smith, 1894
 Mynes woodfordi Godman & Salvin, 1888

References

Nymphalini
Butterfly genera
Taxa named by Jean Baptiste Boisduval